Cruce is a surname. Notable people with the surname include:

 Jamie Cruce, American football coach and player
 Lee Cruce (1863–1933), American lawyer, banker, and politician
 Petrus de Cruce (13th century), French cleric, composer, and music theorist

See also
 Cruces (disambiguation)